The Salvadoran Football Federation ( or ) is the official governing football organization in El Salvador and is in charge of the El Salvador national football team, and El Salvador national beach soccer team The federation is also in charge of the three tiers of domestic club competition, including the top-flight Primera División de Fútbol Profesional.

In May 2010, FIFA briefly suspended teams and associated members from international competition on the grounds that the Salvadoran government had not acknowledged the authority of the Normalisation Committee set up to represent FESFUT. On May 28, the suspension was lifted.

In November 2010 the federation started the first women's football league in El Salvador.

In September 2013, the federation imposed a life-time ban on 14 members of the country's national team for match-fixing and another three players were banned for between six and 18 months. The players were accused of receiving bribes for international matches.

On July 31, 2014, the general assembly of football elected Jorge Alberto Cabrera Rajo as the new president of the federation.

Board of directors

Referees

References

External links
 
 El Salvador at FIFA site
 El Salvador at CONCACAF site
 Facebook profile
 Twitter profile

Football in El Salvador
El Salvador
Association football governing bodies in Central America
Sports organizations established in 1935
1935 establishments in El Salvador